Bexhill may refer to:

Bexhill-on-Sea, East Sussex, England
Bexhill, New South Wales, Australia
Bexhill, Saskatchewan, Canada